Pantheon of prominent Azerbaijanis is a memorial cemetery of prominent Azerbaijanis in Tbilisi, Georgia. It's part of the National Botanical Garden of Georgia. Notable Azerbaijanis buried here include Mirza Fatali Akhundov, Fatali Khan Khoyski, Mirza Shafi Vazeh, Hasan bey Aghayev, Mammad Hasan Hajinski, Mehdigulu Khan Vafa and others.

History

The cemetery was founded in 17th century and was known as "Gorkhana" (meaning "mausoleum" in Persian) at the time of its creation. All the Muslims of Tbilisi at the time were buried in this cemetery.

In the 20th century, the cemetery was demolished. Azerbaijani professor Vagif Arzumanly visited the site in 1959 and found the half-destroyed grave of Mirza Shafi Vazeh, as well as multiple graves of children. In 1964–1965, the relatives of the people buried in the cemetery were informed that a botanical garden was to be built in location of the former cemetery. After this, Arzumanly visited the site again with Georgian professor Ivan Yenikolopov. They found and took pictures of around 100 graves. Only a handful of graves of well-known Azerbaijanis have survived, with the oldest one belonging to Mirza Shafi Vazeh, who died in 1852.

In 1996, the grave of Mirza Fatali Akhundov  was laid to rest in the cemetery. The event was attended by Azerbaijani president Heydar Aliyev in his first diplomatic trip to Georgia.

The graves of Mirza Shafi Vazeh, Mirza Fatali Akhundov, Hasan bay Aghayev, Fatali Khan Khoyski were reconstructed by Heydar Aliyev Foundation in 2006.

References

Cemeteries in Georgia (country)
Monuments and memorials in Tbilisi
Azerbaijani diaspora
Azerbaijan–Georgia (country) relations